Sujowali is a village in the Punjab province of Pakistan. It is located at 32°13'0N 74°44'40E with an altitude of 236 metres (777 feet). Neighbouring settlements include Qila Sobha Singh, Kalluwali and Basaya

References

Villages in Narowal District